Mate con malicia (Spanish: "mate with malice") or mate con punta ("spiked mate") is a drink made of mate infusion and aguardiente or pisco, consumed mainly in rural areas of Chile. Huarisnaque is typically drunk by huasos, gauchos, fishermen and lumberjacks to warm up, as it combines both alcohol and the psychoactive substances of yerba mate, namely caffeine, theobromine and theophylline.

References

Cocktails with brandy
Chilean alcoholic drinks
Yerba mate drinks